Dajuan Marquett "D. J." Wagner Jr. (born May 4, 2005) is an American basketball player who attends Camden High School in Camden, New Jersey. He is the son of a former professional basketball player Dajuan Wagner and grandson of professional player "Ice Man" Milt Wagner. He is a consensus five-star recruit and one of the top players in the 2023 recruiting class. He has committed to play at the University of Kentucky.

High school career
Before high school, Wagner gave up playing football in favor of focusing on basketball, after watching video highlights of his father and grandfather. His high school debut was highly anticipated, as his former middle school football coach said, “It’s like there’s this energy out there, everybody waiting for him to get to high school.”

During the summer heading into his freshman season at Camden, Wagner was one of just three Class of 2023 prospects invited to the USA Basketball July mini camp in Colorado Springs. He was invited back to a second USA Basketball event several months later, before the start of the high school basketball season in New Jersey.

In his first game, December 20, 2019, in front of a capacity crowd that waited more than an hour to try to get admission into the game, Wagner scored 15 points despite missing 6 of his first 7 field goal attempts.

Coached by former NBA player Rick Brunson, Wagner helped lead Camden to 25 consecutive victories before the team's season was ended due to the COVID-19 pandemic. Camden earned New Jersey Boys Basketball Team of the Year honors by NJ.com.

As a freshman, Wagner averaged 18.5 points en route to earning MaxPreps Freshman All-American honors.  On January 24, 2023 Wagner became the first 3rd generation McDonald's All-American, joining both his father Dajuan and grandfather Milt.

Recruiting
Wagner is considered a five-star recruit by 247Sports, ESPN and Rivals .

In the middle of his junior season, Wagner saw his ranking of number one player in the class of 2023 drop to third by Rivals after holding the reign of consensus number one pick in the class of 2023 for two years since 2020. On November 14, 2022, Wagner committed to the University of Kentucky, deciding over Louisville.

Personal life
Wagner is the son of Dajuan Wagner and Syreeta Brittingham. His grandfather, Milt Wagner, was a second-round pick in the 1986 NBA Draft. He is seeking to become the first-ever third-generation NBA player.

References

External links
USA Basketball bio

2005 births
Living people
21st-century African-American sportspeople
American men's basketball players
African-American basketball players
Basketball players from Camden, New Jersey
Camden High School (New Jersey) alumni
Point guards